AU10TIX, (formerly the technology arm of ICTS International) is an identity verification company based in Hod HaSharon, Israel.

AU10TIX was founded in 2002 as the technology arm of ICTS International and later diversified into commercial and civil markets. AU10TIX is the technology subsidiary of ICTS international, a Dutch firm that provides solutions and services in the field of aviation and general security. ICTS International shares are traded on OTCQB under the symbol ICTSF. AU10TIX online ID authentication technology platform has been first to introduce a completely automated, machine-learning enhanced process  that includes ID image auto-classification, multi-factor image manipulation detection and collateral risk factor analytics .

AU10TIX's most recent funding is an $80M investment from TPG and Oak HC/FT. Headquartered in Israel, AU10TIX is a subsidiary of ICTS International N.V. (OTCQB: ICTSF).

References

Identity management systems
Mobile payments